The Primary FRCA is a postgraduate examination in anaesthesia, more fully called the Primary Examination of the Diploma of Fellowship of the British Royal College of Anaesthetists (RCoA).

Trainee anaesthetists in the United Kingdom are required to pass this examination before applying for Higher Specialist Training (a Specialist Registrar post) in Anaesthesia. With the introduction of MMC in August 2007, the Primary FRCA will become a requirement for application to Specialist Training Year 3, known generally as ST3.

Entrance requirements
Any medically trained person registered with the General Medical Council (GMC) with at least one year of specialist RCoA training.

The cost of the MCQ element is £305 with the OSCE and Viva Voce exams costing £555 for both.

Applicants are only allowed four attempts at the primary FRCA.

Syllabus
The Primary FRCA examination syllabus covers:
Anatomy
Physiology
Clinical Anaesthesia
Pharmacology
Physics
Anaesthetic Equipment
Clinical Measurement
Pathology
Practical Anaesthetic Skills
Resuscitation
Statistics

Form of the examination
The examination takes the form of a Multiple Choice Question paper and, for candidates successful in this, an Objective Structured Clinical Examination (OSCE) and Viva Voce (oral) examination. Successful Candidates are informed the same day, after the OSCE and Viva exams.

The examination is held three times a year, with the MCQ being held in regional centres around the UK (e.g. London, Edinburgh, Birmingham, Belfast and Sheffield) and the OSCE/Viva being held at Churchill House, the College headquarters in London. Only those candidates who clearly pass the MCQ are invited to participate in the OSCE/Viva.

Marking Scheme
Each quarter of the examination is marked as follows:
2: pass.
1: borderline.
0: fail.

To pass the examination overall, the minimum mark is 37 out of 48 (maximum of 2 per question, 12 questions, 2 examiners) .

Membership
Completion of this exam, in conjunction with at least 12 months of specialist training in the UK, leads to the award of the post-nominal letters MRCA.  Usage is restricted to those no longer in a Specialty Training post.

See also
Final FRCA
Royal College of Anaesthetists

References

Anesthesiology
Medical education in the United Kingdom